Florence Warden (16 May 1857 – 11 May 1929) was an English actress and writer, who wrote many novels under her stage name, her name at birth being Florence Alice Price and her married name Mrs G. E. James.

Life
Warden began life as Florence Alice Price, the daughter of a stockbroker. Born in Hanworth, Middlesex, she was educated in Brighton and France.

In 1877, her first novel, The Wolf at the Door, was published anonymously in Boston, Massachusetts.

From 1880 to 1885, Warden pursued a career as an actress, while she also published stories and novels under her stage name. In 1885, her mystery novel The House on the Marsh (1884) was turned into a play, in which she played the lead. However, Augustus Moore later complained that he had done most of the work of writing the play, but had not been credited, while Charles Percy claimed the plot had been stolen from him.

In 1887, at St Pancras, Warden married George Edward James, an actor. She continued to write novels, but she gave up her acting career. One of her sisters also became a writer, adopting the name Gertrude Warden.

With her husband, Warden had two sons, Godfrey Warden James, born at St Pancras in 1888, and Rupert Warden, born at Ramsgate in 1893; and two daughters, Leslie Gertrude, born in London in 1890, and Olivia Mary, born in Ramsgate, Kent, in 1891.

She lived in Kent for many years, at Ramsgate and later Sandgate.

Florence Warden became a writer of stories for The Gentlewoman, a new magazine established in 1890, and on 15 December 1891 The Times reported that the Christmas number had 

In 1911, Warden, her husband, and her two daughters were living together in three rooms in Maida Vale, when G. E. James was described as an actor, Warden as a writer, and their daughters as music students.

In 1920, The House on the Marsh was turned into a silent movie, The House on the Marsh.

After her death in 1929, Warden was buried as Florence James in the Brompton Cemetery.

Children
Warden’s son Godfrey Warden James (1888–1963), was educated at Oxford, trained as a barrister, worked as a schoolmaster and tutor and as an Administrative Officer in Sierre Leone, and was also a novelist, using the name Adam Broome. When he died in 1963, he was living at Woking and left a modest estate valued at £5,342, .

Warden's son Rupert Warden James (1893-1965) was a sea cadet at the Thames Nautical Training College (HMS Worcester) in the 1911 census. He died at Gosport in 1965.

Warden’s older daughter Leslie Gertrude died unmarried in Westminster in 1956. Her younger daughter Olivia Mary died, also  unmarried, in Chelsea in 1982, aged ninety.

Novels

Plays

Notes

External links

Catalogue of books in the Great Lever Branch Lending Library online at HathiTrust, full text
First supplement of the catalogue of books in the Central Lending Bolton online at HathiTrust, full text
Modern English literature; a selection of the best-known works circulated, with which is embodied a guide to popular works of fiction online at HathiTrust, full text
OCLC Author Florence Warden online at OCLC
The Wolf at the Door online at books.google.co.uk, full text

1857 births
1929 deaths
English novelists
English stage actresses